Harold Gordon Featherstone (February 28, 1923 – July 19, 2003) was an American judge and politician. He served as a Democratic member for the 101st district of the Florida House of Representatives from 1967 to 1972.

Featherstone was born in Miami, Florida. He attended Biarritz American University in France and the University of Miami, where he earned a Bachelor of Laws degree in 1951 and a Juris Doctor degree in 1967. Featherstone served in the United States Army Air Forces during World War II and the Korean War, and was awarded the Bronze Star Medal.

In 1967, Featherstone became the first member for the newly established 101st district of the Florida House of Representatives. He was succeeded by Paul B. Steinberg in 1972. He also served as a judge of the Miami-Dade County Circuit Court from 1972 to 1992, and was a member of the Florida Judicial Qualifications Commission.

Featherstone died in July 2003 in Melbourne, Florida, at the age of 80.

References 

1923 births
2003 deaths
Politicians from Miami
Democratic Party members of the Florida House of Representatives
County judges in the United States
20th-century American politicians
20th-century American judges
University of Miami alumni
American emigrants to France